The name Huaning has been used for 16 tropical cyclones in the Philippine Area of Responsibility in the Northwestern Pacific Ocean.

 Typhoon Cora (1964) (T6406, 08W, Huaning) – struck the Philippines.
 Typhoon Shirley (1968) (T6809, 13W, Huaning)
 Tropical Depression Huaning (1972)
 Typhoon Ruby (1976) (Hauning)
 Tropical Storm Herbert (1980) (T8006, 07W, Huaning)
 Tropical Storm Gerald (1984) (T8410, 11W, Huaning)
 Typhoon Warren (1988) (T8806, 06W, Huaning)
 Tropical Storm Lois (1992) (Huaning)
 Typhoon Herb (1996) (T9609, 10W, Huaning) – struck Ryukyu Islands, Taiwan and China.
 Tropical Storm Bolaven (2000) (T0006, 11W, Huaning)
 Tropical Storm Yutu (2001) (T0107, 10W, Huaning)
 Tropical Storm Sanvu (2005) (T0510, 10W, Huaning)
 Tropical Depression Huaning (2009) (06W, Huaning)
 Typhoon Soulik (2013) (T1307, 07W, Huaning) – struck Taiwan and China.
 Tropical Storm Haitang (2017) (T1710, 12W, Huaning) - struck Taiwan and China
 Tropical Storm Lupit (2021) (T2109, 13W, Huaning) - struck China and Taiwan

Pacific typhoon set index articles